Lieutenant General Mashudi (September 11, 1919 in Cibatu village, Garut Regency, West Java – June 22, 2005 in Jakarta) was a Governor of West Java who served as Vice Chairman of the People's Consultative Assembly (1967-1972).

In 1974, he became Chairman of the West Java Scout Council, and was elected Vice-Chairman of the national headquarters (Kwarnas) of the Gerakan Pramuka. At the National Scout Conference in Bukittinggi, West Sumatra in 1978, he was elected by acclamation as Chairman, in which position he served until 1993.

In 1985, Mashudi was awarded the 181st Bronze Wolf, the only distinction of the World Organization of the Scout Movement, awarded by the World Scout Committee for exceptional services to world Scouting.

References

External links

Scouting in Indonesia
Recipients of the Bronze Wolf Award
1919 births
2005 deaths
Governors of West Java
People from Garut